Brian Jude Cassin (born September 1967) is an Irish businessman, the CEO of Experian.

Cassin was born in September 1967. He is a graduate of Trinity College, Dublin.

He is the CEO of Experian, board member since 16 July 2014, when he was the CFO, and a non-executive director of Sainsbury's.

Cassin previously held senior roles at Baring Brothers International and the London Stock Exchange and was a managing director of the investment bank Greenhill & Co.

References

1967 births
Irish businesspeople
Living people
Alumni of Trinity College Dublin